Just Breathe may refer to:
 Just Breathe (Pearl Jam song)
 Just Breathe (Sky-Hi song)
 Just Breathe, an album by LoveHateHero